Sarani (also Romanized as Sārānī) is a village in Margan Rural District, in the Central District of Hirmand County, Sistan and Baluchestan Province, Iran. At the 2006 census, its population was 40, in 6 families.

References 

Populated places in Hirmand County